Adolphe Gutmann (originally Wilhelm Adolf Gutmann) (12 January 1819 – 27 October 1882) was a German pianist and composer who was a pupil and friend of Frédéric Chopin and Franz Liszt.

Life
Gutmann was born in Heidelberg. He came to Paris in 1834, at the age of 15, to study with Chopin, becoming one of the composer's favourites. He performed in concert with Chopin, Liszt, Charles-Valentin Alkan and Pierre-Joseph Zimmerman, Alkan's transcription of part of Beethoven's Seventh Symphony at a concert of 1838. Gutmann was also the dedicatee of Chopin's Scherzo, Op. 39, published in 1839.

Gutmann acted as copyist for a number of Chopin's works, and acted as a courier to take Chopin's letters to his family in Warsaw. Gutmann's own set of Etudes (his Op. 12) is dedicated to Chopin. He was present at Chopin's death bed and preserved the glass from which Chopin took his last drink of water. Both he and Alkan were bequeathed the notes that Chopin had compiled in preparation for a piano teaching method. Gutmann died in La Spezia.

Works
Inspired by the style of his master, Gutmann is the author of several nocturnes, and twelve studies, studies characteristics that seem to announce the coming of Impressionism (two of his studies are called Sea, and The Storm, and are respective replicas of the study No. 1, Op. 25, by Chopin, and the Révolutionnaire). All his works have been quite popular in their time; but faded thereafter.

 Nocturne Lyrique 
 Nocturne No.7, Op.20 
 Deux Nocturnes, Op.8 
 Deux Nocturnes, Op.16 
 Notturno grazioso, Op.51

References

4. Ewa Sławińska-Dahlig, "Adolphe Gutmann - ulubiony uczeń Chopina", Warszawa 2013. .

External links

1819 births
1882 deaths
German classical pianists
Male classical pianists
German classical composers
German male classical composers
Musicians from Heidelberg
Pupils of Frédéric Chopin
19th-century classical composers
19th-century classical pianists
19th-century German composers
German pianists
German male pianists
19th-century German male musicians